Forficulites is an extinct genus of earwig within the family Forficulidae containing a single species, Forficulites rottensis, that lived during the Oligocene epoch. It was described by Georg Statz in 1939, from the Rott Formation in Germany.

References 

Fossil taxa described in 1939
Forficulidae
Dermaptera genera
Fossils of Germany
Oligocene insects
Prehistoric insects of Europe
Prehistoric insect genera
Rupelian genus first appearances
Chattian genus extinctions